The "Center for the History of Women Philosophers and Scientists", HWPS for short is a research project, founded and directed by Ruth Hagengruber, at the University of Paderborn in 2006. 

As the first of its kind in Europe, the Center HWPS is dedicated to the study of women philosophers and scientists. The Center currently hosts research projects on Émilie Du Châtelet, women in early phenomenology, women in analytical philosophy among others as well as the secular diversity project In der Philosophie Zuhause.

About the Center

History and Awards 
The Center for History of Women Philosophers and Scientists received its first funding by the Ministry of Innovation, Science and Research (NRW) in 2016. In 2018, the Center HWPS has received the research Award “DARIAH-DE DH-Award Tools und Projekte” for the Encyclopedia of Concise Concepts by Women Philosophers (ECC), it received the “Award for Innovation and Quality in Teaching” of Paderborn University for the joint project “Philosophie in den Medien“ (Philosophy in the Media) in 2014, as well as the research award “Fellowship für Innovationen in der digitalen Hochschullehre”.

Since 2018, the Center HWPS awards the “Elisabeth of Bohemia Prize”, sponsored by Professor Ulrike Detmers, head of various gender equality projects. The Elisabeth of Bohemia Prize is the first prize that celebrates the long history of women in philosophy. It is named in honor of the philosopher Elisabeth of Bohemia (1618–1680) who lived nearby Paderborn, and is awarded to an internationally recognized philosopher for outstanding services to research on women in the history of philosophy. Awardees of the Bohemia Prize include Lisa Shapiro, Mary Ellen Waithe, Mitieli Seixas da Silva and Sarah Hutton.

Purpose 
The purpose of the Center HWPS is to foster engagement with, and research in the history of women philosophers and scientists. While the history of women philosophers “stretches back as far as the history of philosophy itself”, and despite the fact that participation of women philosophers in the intellectual discourses of their respective epochs is undeniable, women philosophers from the history of philosophy are relatively absent in the curricula of modern universities and educational institutions, compared to their male counterparts. The work at the Center HWPS aims to show that women philosophers have been involved in intellectual activity since Greek antiquity, including its periods of inclusion and exclusion: “The presence as well as the absence of women philosophers throughout the course of history parallels the history of philosophy”. Founder Ruth E. Hagengruber, director of the Center and advocate for the inclusion of women philosophers in the philosophical canon, claims: „Using the history of women philosophers as a methodical approach to philosophy is a unique and indispensable means to widen and to change philosophical insights.“ For instance, projects on Émilie Du Châtelet investigate her influence on the works of Immanuel Kant and Euler. Another project on women in early phenomenology elucidates the significance of the writings of some of the first women active in German academia.

A project in digital humanities 
In order to foster access to research, the Center HWPS engages in the digital humanities, especially public teaching and online tools. The overall goal of this milestone project is to complement, promote, and enable future research in the area of women in the history of philosophy. The Center for History of Women Philosophers and Scientists develops digital media and tools to assist in research in the humanities, and utilizes digital platforms to accommodate traditional text-based learning. Example include the talk series “Conversations with Diotima”, the “Encyclopedia of Concise Concepts by Women Philosophers” (ECC) and the “Directory of Women Philosophers”. The Archive and Library of Women in Early Phenomenology, Online Editions on Émilie Du Châtelet, and other long-term to establish the research on women philosophers in “Online and Print Resources”. The Center has an associated YouTube channel and offers a repository of digital media named as the Center for the History of Women Philosophers Channel.

Network 
The Center HWPS collaborates with national and international academics and research groups, such as the “International Association of Women Philosophers” (IAPh), founded 1974 in Germany  the “AG Frauen in der Philosophie” a working group on behalf of the Deutsche Gesellschaft für Philosophie (DFG), “The Society for the Study of Women Philosophers”, via Erasmus agreements it is connected to partner institutions such as Maynooth University, Ireland and Bar-Ilan University, Israel, Yeditepe University, Turkey, and other universities. The Center connects researchers on an international level and offers fellows the opportunity to collaborate on seminars, conferences and workshops.

Print recources and digital projects

Émilie Du Châtelet: St. Petersburg Manuscripts & Paris Manuscripts 
It is widely agreed that in the Institutions de Physique, Du Châtelet innovatively combines metaphysics and physics, creating a work that is not merely a textbook on natural philosophy, but makes important contributions to the philosophy of science. Moreover, the considerable influence of this work on later Enlightenment thinkers, both in France and abroad, is well documented.

In collaboration with the National Library of Russia in Saint Petersburg, the Center uploaded the historical-critical edition of the Saint Petersburg Manuscripts within 2020 to 2022. It is the first institutionalized international cooperation project in the area of Du Châtelet-edition and research and the first digital edition project in the field of classical humanities at Paderborn University.

DFG-funded online historical-critical edition of the Paris Manuscripts of the Institutions de Physique present the reconstruction of the first drafts of the Institutions de physique, making early and alternative versions of this important text, first published in 1740, 1740 and 1742, freely available to the public.  December 17, 2021. The aim of this online launching is to share with the wider scholarly community. Updates and news can be found on the website of the Paderborn Center for the History of Women Philosophers and Scientists.

New Voices: A network of scholars 
New Voices on Women in the History of Philosophy is an international group for scholars working on women in the history of philosophy, founded in December 2020 with the intention to give especially early career scholarsa voice and a platform and to make seen established scholars in the field. New Voices has more than 100 members who do research or teach on women in the history of philosophy all over the world and pictures more than 150 women. Talk series via Zoom are held regularly.

Women in Early Phenomenology 
The purpose of this project is to shed new light on the lives and work of the women who took part in the early phenomenological movement, with particular focus on Edith Stein, Hedwig Conrad-Martius, and Gerda Walther. The recent resurgence of interest in the history of the phenomenological movement has shown that these women were not marginal figures, but important contributors to the development of phenomenology. The Center is also involved in the publication of bilingual translations of key texts of women philosophers.

In der Philosophie Zuhause 
In 2011, at Paderborn University the diversity project, In der Philosophie zu Hause, issues both in research and in teaching as well as in terms of student support. As an ideological and religious neutral discipline, philosophy proved to be an excellent instrument of discussion and mediation of diversity, addressing  topics of race, class and gender.

EcoTechGender 
Economy, Ecology, Technology and Gender are today the most challenging and decisive factors of our society that predicts the future of humanity. The teaching- and research area EcoTechGender is dedicated to the philosophic analysis of the relation between these topics. Our research and teaching focusses on the interactions between those categories including the influence on daily political and societal issues.

Study

Summer and Autumn schools 
The Libori Summer School and Autumn Schools were organized for the first time in Paderborn in 2017. It offers international participants the opportunity to attend various themed courses in the History of Women philosophers led by renowned experts in their fields.

Online Teaching 
The teaching spectrum is expanded through making available digital learning materials. With the teaching project „Philosophy goes MOOC“ (Massive Open Online Courses), long-term, intensive and independent engagement with philosophical content to support the study of the history of women philosophers .

ECC 
The „Encyclopedia of Concise Concepts by Women Philosophers“ (ECC), coedited by Ruth Hagengruber and Mary Ellen Waithe is the first open access online encyclopedia dedicated to research on women philosophers and their concepts. Articles contain descriptions of concepts that originated with, or were significantly advanced by a female philosopher. Entries include references and bibliographies of primary and secondary sources.

The Directory of women philosophers 
The Directory of women philosophers and scientists from approx. 2300 BCE to the 20th  century currently provides information on more than 240 women philosophers. Entries contain detailed biographical information as well as a list of primary and secondary sources, including texts, online sources and video material.

Timeline 
The Timeline includes biographical data, events, as well as an extensive list of primary and secondary literature.

Fellows 
The Center regularly welcomes fellows from all over the world to contribute to research programs and co-organize international conferences. Visiting student researchers can join the Center via existing ERASMUS agreements.

Public relations 
The Center is active in several social media platforms, including Facebook, Instagram, Twitter, LinkedIn and Academia.

References

External links 
 Website of the Center for the History of Women Philosophers and Scientists
 Social Media - Linktree, HWPS

Paderborn
Paderborn University
Women and philosophy
Women scientists
History
Philosophy organizations